The St. Thomas & St. John League is a regional soccer championship played in Saint Thomas and Saint John, United States Virgin Islands. The two best teams of the championship qualifies to US Virgin Islands Championship.

St Thomas League Clubs 2012/13
HT Victory
Laraza
New Vibes
Positive Vibes
Raymix
Togetherness
UWS Upsetters SC
Waitikubuli

Previous winners
1995/96: MI Roc Masters
1996/97: Saint John United SC (Cruz Bay)
1997/98: MI Roc Masters
1998/99: MI Roc Masters
1999/00: UWS Upsetters SC
2000/01: UWS Upsetters SC
2001/02: Waitikubuli United SC
2002/03: Waitikubuli United SC
2003/04: not known (not Positive Vibes)
2004/05: Positive Vibes
2005/06: Positive Vibes
2006/07: Positive Vibes
2007/08: Positive Vibes
2008/09: New Vibes
2009/10: Positive Vibes
2010/11: apparently not held
2011/12: New Vibes
2012/13: Positive Vibes
2013/14: Positive Vibes
2014/15: Raymix
2015/16: Raymix
2016/17: Raymix

Top scorers

References

External links
US Virgin Islands - List of Champions, RSSSF.com

2
Second level football leagues in the Caribbean